John Lecky (29 August 1940 – 25 February 2003) was a Canadian sport rower. He was born in Vancouver, British Columbia. He competed at the 1960 Summer Olympics in Rome, where he won a silver medal in coxed eights with the Canadian team.  He was in the winning Cambridge crews in the University Boat Race in 1962 and 1964.

Lecky was a member of the Executive Committee and Board of Directors for Calgary Olympic Organizing Committee of the 1988 Winter Olympics.

References

1940 births
2003 deaths
Rowers from Vancouver
Canadian male rowers
Olympic rowers of Canada
Olympic silver medalists for Canada
Rowers at the 1960 Summer Olympics
Medalists at the 1960 Summer Olympics
20th-century Canadian people